Paul Nowak (born May 1972) is General Secretary of the Trades Union Congress (TUC), having taken up the post on 29 December 2022. His appointment was announced in July 2022. He was previously Deputy General Secretary of the TUC.

Biography
Born in Bebington, Merseyside, Nowak first joined as a union member at age 17 when he had a part-time job at Asda. He subsequently became an activist in the Communication Workers Union. He became Vice President of the Wirral Trades Union Council at the age of 19 – the youngest person to hold the post.

He began working for the TUC in 2000. In 2013 he was named TUC Assistant General Secretary, and in 2016 Deputy General Secretary. 

He is credited with ensuring that the Department for Business, Enterprise and Industrial Strategy (BEIS) guidance for safe working during the pandemic was significantly stronger than that first proposed by ministers. He supported the then TUC General Secretary Frances O’Grady in securing the Job Retention Scheme.  

The TUC announced in July 2022 that Nowak would be its next General Secretary, taking office from January 2023.

References

1972 births
Living people
British trade union leaders
People from Bebington
English people of Polish descent
English people of Chinese descent
General Secretaries of the Trades Union Congress